Maolsheachlainn Ó Dúgáin was an Irish scribe.

Ó Dúgáin  was a native of Claregalway and related to Tomás Bacach Ó Dúgáin and Liam Ó Dúgáin, all of the same parish. His scribal work consists of songs.

References
Scríobhaithe Lámhscríbhinní Gaeilge I nGaillimh 1700-1900, William Mahon, in "Galway:History and Society", 1996

People from County Galway
Irish-language writers
Irish scribes